The 2017 Social Democratic Party of Finland leadership election was held on 4 February 2017. 495 voting attendees of the 45th Social Democratic party convention, held in Lahti, elected the incumbent chair Antti Rinne for a second term as the chair of Social Democratic Party. MP Timo Harakka finished second and MP Tytti Tuppurainen finished third.

Results

References

Political party leadership elections in Finland
2017 in Finland
Social Democratic Party of Finland leadership election